The Ancient Church of the East is an Eastern Christian denomination. It branched from the Assyrian Church of the East in 1964, under the leadership of Mar Toma Darmo (d. 1969). It is one of three Assyrian Churches that claim continuity with the historical Church of the East (the ancient Patriarchal Province of Seleucia-Ctesiphon), the others being the Assyrian Church of the East and the Chaldean Catholic Church. The Ancient Church of the East is headquartered in Baghdad, Iraq.

History 
The Ancient Church of the East is yet another name historically used for the Church of the East. This name became officially used when a schism happened in1964, due to a decision made by the Patriarch Mar Shimun XXIII Eshai, to switch over from the traditional Julian Calendar which the church has been following since its establishment before the mid first century CE to the Gregorian Calendar. Part of the Church of the East, then led by the Patriarch Mar Shimun XXIII Eshai, continued with the Patriarch's decision. This became the reason for the schism. The Ancient Church of the East in 1968 consecrated their own Patriarch, Mar Toma Darmo, who strongly opposed to the system of hereditary succession of the position of patriarch of the Church of the East, as well as its adoption of the Gregorian calendar "and other modernizing measures". Mar Darmo was also joined by "various other groups opposed to Mar Shimun."

Since 1969, the see of the Ancient Church of the East is in Baghdad.

Mar Yacob III Daniel was elected as new patriarch in June 2022. In the month of August, patriarch-elect Mar Yacob III Daniel  abdicated, and on 12 November 2022 the Holy Synod elected Mar Gewargis Younan to take his place. The consecration of the Patriarch-elect is scheduled to take place in Baghdad in June 2023.

Organisation

Holy Synod 
The Holy Synod is as follow:
 Yacob Daniel, Metropolitan of the Archdiocese of Australia and New Zealand (seat in Sydney, Australia)
 Zaia Khoshaba, Metropolitan of the Archdiocese of Canada and the United States (seat in Toronto, Canada)
 Toma Aramia, Metropolitan who resides in Canada (seat in Toronto, Canada)
 Gewargis Younan, Bishop of the Diocese of Eastern United States and Secretary of the Holy Synod (seat in Chicago, USA)
 Petros Ashur Tamras, Bishop of the Diocese of Western United States of America (seat in Modesto, California, USA)
 Shimun Daniel Alkhoury, Bishop of Iraq and the Middle East.

List of catholicos-patriarchs

Prior to 1964

Since 1968 
 Thoma Darmo (1968–1969)
 Addai II Giwargis (1972–2022)
 Yacob III Daniel (June – August 2022)
 Gewargis III Younan (12 November 2022 – present)

Celebration of Christmas

Prior to a certain decree, there were already a few parishes in the diaspora that celebrated Christmas according to the Gregorian calendar date. After a popular vote was conducted in several parishes, the decree was accepted and enacted by the Addai II Giwargis in June 2010 to take effect for Christmas 2010. All of the parishes worldwide accepted this decree. Since then, the Ancient Church of the East officially conducts the entire liturgical year, feasts and commemorations according to the Julian calendar, except for Christmas day. Despite the fact that a number of the separatist parishes have emerged from the Ancient Church of the East since 2011, all of them continue to adhere to the decree of June 2010 which regulated the celebration of Christmas according to the Gregorian calendar date. Currently, there are no current or previous separatist parishes that emerged as a reaction to the decision of June 2010, despite claims made by several websites and sources.

Relationship with the Assyrian Church of the East
Under the tenure of Addai II, the Ancient Church of the East has made several gestures towards reunification with the Assyrian Church of the East. The most prominent of these is undoubtedly the declaration made in June 2010 stating that the Ancient Church of the East would now celebrate Christmas in accordance with the Gregorian calendar. Previously, the church used the traditional Julian date for the Christmas Day (December 25 of the Julian calendar currently corresponds to January 7 of the Gregorian Calendar), as the Church of the East had throughout its history. The decision was to be implemented later that year, on December 25, 2010.

Dialogue for reunification 
Following the death (March 2015) of Dinkha IV, Catholicos-Patriarch of the Assyrian Church of the East, dialogue of unification continued between the churches.

On May 22, 2015, a meeting involving prelates of both Holy Councils took place in a suburb of Chicago, Illinois, in the library of St. Andrew's Assyrian Church of the East. Present were Yacoub Daniel, Zaia Khoshaba, and Gewargis Younan representing the Ancient Church of the East, and Gewargis Sliwa, Awa Royel, and Iskhaq Yousif representing the Assyrian Church of the East. Archdeacon William Toma served as the meeting's common secretary. Yacoub Daniel flew in from Australia for the meeting, and Zaia traveled from Canada.

On June 1, 2015, the Holy Synod of the Assyrian Church of the East met in Erbil, Iraq, to discuss the future of the church. The date had previously been arranged for the election of the new Catholicos-Patriarch. Awa Royel issued a statement on the same day, notifying the public that a response to the Ancient Church of the East's recommendations for reunification had been delivered to their prelates. The letter requested a prompt response to the terms, and the election of the new Patriarch was suspended until the following week, on June 8, 2015.

On June 5, 2015, Aprem Mooken issued a formal statement announcing that the election of the next Catholicos-Patriarch of the Assyrian Church of the East was suspended until September (2015), pending the unification of the churches.

It turned out that unification was not achievable. On 18 September, Assyrian Church of the East elected Gewargis III as the new head of the Church, and he was consecrated and enthroned as Catholicos-Patriarch on 27 September 2015.

In spite of the fact that unification was not achieved, leaders of both Churches have continued to promote various forms of mutual cooperation.

After the death of Mar Addai II, reunification failed in May 2022 and the election of a new patriarch was therefore launched.

See also
 Assyrian people
 Chaldean Catholic Church
 Chaldean Syrian Church
 Church of the East
 East Syrian Rite
 Syro-Malabar Catholic Church

References

Sources

Further reading 

 
 
 

 
Christian organizations established in 1964
1964 establishments in Iraq
Christian denominations established in the 20th century